The yellow-throated vireo (Vireo flavifrons) is a small American songbird.

Etymology
"Vireo" is a Latin word referring to a green migratory bird, perhaps the female golden oriole, possibly the European greenfinch. The specific flavifrons is from the Latin words flavus, "yellow", and frons, "forehead".

Description

Adults are mainly olive on the head and upperparts with a yellow throat and white belly; they have dark eyes with yellow "spectacles". The tail and wings are dark with white wing bars. They have thick blue-grey legs and a stout bill.

Measurements:

 Length: 5.1-5.9 in (13-15 cm)
 Weight: 0.5-0.7 oz (15-21 g)
 Wingspan: 9.1 in (23 cm)

Habitat and distribution
Their breeding habitat is open deciduous woods in southern Canada and the eastern United States.

These birds migrate to the deep southern United States, Mexico, the Caribbean, and Central America. They are very rare vagrants to western Europe; there is a September 1990 record from Kenidjack Valley in Cornwall, Great Britain, and September 1998 record from Heligoland, a small German archipelago in the German Bight.

Diet and behaviour
They forage for insects high in trees. They also eat berries, especially before migration and in winter when they are occasionally seen feeding on gumbo-limbo (Bursera simaruba) fruit. They make a thick cup nest attached to a fork in a tree branch.

References

External links
 
 Yellow-throated Vireo Species Account—Cornell Lab of Ornithology
 Yellow-throated Vireo—Vireo flavifrons—USGS Patuxent Bird Identification InfoCenter
 Yellow-throated Vireo Bird Sound

yellow-throated vireo
Native birds of the Eastern United States
Birds of the Dominican Republic
yellow-throated vireo
yellow-throated vireo